Kowit Wattana (born 11 March 1947 in Phak Hai) is a Thai Police General and politician. From 2004 to 2007 he was the Commissioner-General of the Royal Thai Police. In 2008, he was Minister of the Interior, and from 2011 to 2012 Deputy Prime Minister under Yingluck Shinawatra. Kowit is a member of the ruling Pheu Thai Party.

Early life and police service
Kowit Wattana's father was a teacher and prefect of Phak Hai District. Kowit graduated from the Armed Forces Academies Preparatory School (class 6) and the Royal Thai Police Cadet Academy (class 22). He started his career in public service as an officer of the Border Patrol Police. He served in this paramilitary unit for 27 years.

From 1970 to 1975 he was on the Border Patrol Police special company fighting the communist insurgency in Thailand. Later he commanded the troops responsible for a  section of the Thai-Burmese border. Later he was leader of the Border Patrol Police in the whole northern sector. In this position his main challenges were fighting drug-related crime, shutting down several heroin factories in Chiang Mai, Chiang Rai, Phayao and Mae Hong Son, and counter-insurgency. In 1994, he was promoted to national commander of the Border Patrol.

In 2004, he was named Commissioner-General of the Royal Thai Police.

Political career
Following the 2006 coup d'état, Kowit was named third chief deputy of the Council for Democratic Reform under Constitutional Monarchy.
On 22 September, the council gave Police General Wattana absolute power over all police matters. He was also made Chair of a new National Police Commission. The commission will be assigned to amend the 2004 National Police Bill over the next year; the bill had been originally been approved by the elected parliament. Under the pre-coup legal framework, the premier had been responsible for chairing the commission. So far, two members of the new police commission have been announced, Pol Gen Phatcharawat Wongsuwan and Pol Gen Issaraphan Sanitwong. He was replaced by Seripisut Temiyavet in 2007. There was speculation about the motivation behind the replacement, as Kowit had earlier arrested several military personnel for alleged involvement in the 2006 Bangkok New Year's Eve bombings.

On 2 August 2008, Kowit Wattana was appointed Deputy Prime Minister and Minister of Interior, replacing Chalerm Yubamrung for the latter position. On 24 September 2008, Kowit was appointed Minister of Interior in Somchai Wongsawat's cabinet, serving until the government broke apart on 2 December 2008.

He is an executive member of the Pheu Thai Party, successor of the dissolved and banned People's Power Party. In September 2010 he was expected to replace Yongyuth Wichaidit as the party's chairman, but he demurred and asked Yongyuth to carry on.

On 9 August 2011, Kowit was appointed Deputy Prime Minister in Yingluck Shinawatra's cabinet. He resigned from the office due to a major reshuffle of the Yingluck cabinet on 18 January 2012.

References

Kowit Wattana
Living people
Kowit Wattana
Kowit Wattana
Kowit Wattana
Kowit Wattana
1947 births
Kowit Wattana